Elias Arnér (Elias S. J. Arnér; born 2 March 1966) is a Swedish professor in biochemistry active in the fields of redox biology and cancer research. He studied medicine at Karolinska Institutet and became a medical doctor in 1997. He received his Ph.D. in 1993 from Karolinska Institutet on the subject of nucleoside analogues in relation to cancer and HIV treatment. He moved to Munich, Germany where he started focusing on selenoproteins. He returned to Karolinska Institutet where he became associate professor in 2000 and appointed professor in 2009. He is head of the biochemistry division in the department of medical biochemistry and biophysics at Karolinska Institutet. In 2017 he chairs the Se2017 – 200 Years of Selenium Research  Conference.

Research
The research of Arnér focuses on redox control of cell function and mechanisms of selenoprotein dependent pathways, with a special interest in the mammalian thioredoxin system. Another focus of research is the development of production systems for selenoproteins and their potential use in diverse biotechnological applications.

Private Life and Artistic work
Arnér is the son of Swedish writer Sivar Arnér (1909–1997) and the Hungarian-born artist and author Lenke Rothman (1929–2008). He has created several installation, seminars and publications with the conceptual artist Per Hüttner: Begrepp - En samling and (In)Visible Dialogues.

Publications 
 Publication list in PubMed
 Profile in Google Scholar
 Arnér entry in ORCID

Collaborative works with Per Hüttner:
 (In)Visible Dialogues, 2011, languages: English and Swedish, 240 pages, design by Åbäke. Published by Dent-de-Leone.  and 
 Begrepp - En samling, 1992, ed. P. Huttner and E. Arnér with texts by Erna Möller, Rolf Luft, Lenke Rothman, Lennart Wetterberg and Lars Olson, Published by Royal Institute of Art in Stockholm.

References

External links 
 Elias Arnér profile page at Karolinska Institutet
 The Division of Biochemistry at Karolinska Institutet

Swedish biochemists
1966 births
Living people
Academic staff of the Karolinska Institute
Swedish educators